Morotopithecus is a species of fossil ape discovered in Miocene-age deposits of Moroto, Uganda.

The phylogenetic status of Morotopithecus bishopi is debated to the extent that it challenges established views on the connection between Miocene primates and extant hominids (i.e. great apes). Parsimonious phylogenetic analyses indicate Morotopithecus is more derived than Proconsul, Afropithecus, and Kenyapithecus, but less derived than Oreopithecus, Sivapithecus, and Dryopithecus. Under this arrangement, Morotopithecus would be a sister taxon to extant great apes while Hylobates (gibbons) seem to have branched off before this clade appeared.

In a comparison of teeth characteristics  of Morotopithecus to Afropithecus the results showed little difference, plus evidence gathered from cranial comparisons also indicate that the two genera may be the same, a conclusion of limited confidence due to the lack of evidence to produce a complete anatomy for both (Patel, Grossman 2005). Meanwhile, Pickford (2002) referred the vertebrae to Ugandapithecus, and considered Morotopithecus synonymous with Afropithecus.

References

Prehistoric apes
Miocene primates of Africa
Fossil taxa described in 1997
Prehistoric primate genera
Miocene mammals of Africa
Monotypic prehistoric primate genera